Coan is a surname.

People with this surname include:

 Andy Coan (1958-2017), U.S. swimmer
 Bert Coan (1940-2022), U.S. American football player
 Blair Coan (1883-1939), U.S. government agent
 Ed Coan (born 1963), U.S. powerlifter
 Frederick G. Coan (1859-1943), U.S. Christian missionary
 Gil Coan (1922-2020), U.S. baseball player
 Jack Coan (born 1998), American football player
 Jim Coan (born 1969), U.S. psychologist and neuroscientist
 Maud Coan Josaphare (1886-1939; born Maud Josephine Coan), U.S. educator
 McKenzie Coan (born 1996), U.S. swimmer
 Nigel Coan, Uk animator
 Olayr Coan (1959-2007), Brazilian actor
 Stephen M. Coan, U.S. environmentalist
 Titus Coan (1801-1881), U.S. Christian missionary

See also

 Coan (disambiguation)
 James Carlile McCoan (1829-1904), Irish politician
 Coen (name)
 Cohen (surname)